El Segundo Boulevard is a west-east thoroughfare in Los Angeles County. At one time, it was named Ballona Avenue.

Geography
El Segundo Boulevard begins as a minor street in Lynwood.  When it runs through Compton, Willowbrook, Gardena, Hawthorne, and El Segundo, it is mostly a major street before its west end in El Segundo.  For much of its existence, El Segundo Boulevard is in the same position 128th Street would be.

Transportation
Gardena Transit line 5 runs along El Segundo Boulevard.  The Metro C Line serves a station at its intersection with Nash Street.

Streets in Los Angeles County, California
Compton, California
El Segundo, California
Gardena, California
Hawthorne, California
Willowbrook, California